John the Divine (John of Patmos) is the traditional author of the Book of Revelation.

John the Divine or Saint/St John the Divine refers to the man whom Christian tradition variously calls:
John the Apostle (died 100), disciple of Jesus
John the Evangelist (15–?), name traditionally given to the author of the Gospel of John

Churches and schools
 St. John the Divine Episcopal Church (Moorhead, Minnesota)
 Cathedral of St. John the Divine, New York
 The Cathedral School of St. John the Divine (New York City)
 Church of St John the Divine, Brooklands, Manchester, England
 Church of St John the Divine, Bulwell, Nottinghamshire, England
 St John the Divine, Horninglow, Staffordshire, England
 St John the Divine, Kennington, London, England

See also 
Community of St. John the Divine, Anglican religious order based in Birmingham, England
Sisterhood of St. John the Divine, Anglican religious order based in Canada
Authorship of the Johannine works
Saint John (disambiguation) for other saints called John